"Sister Of Mercy" is a song by the British pop group Thompson Twins. It was originally included on the group's 1984 album Into The Gap, though a remixed version was released as the fourth single from the album in the summer of 1984. The single peaked at #11 in the UK, spending ten weeks on the UK singles chart.

The promotional music video for this single was directed by Dieter Trattmann and featured actress Frances Tomelty.

The B-side of the single was a megamix of various Thompson Twins songs titled "Out Of The Gap".

Background
The theme of the song is domestic abuse. It was inspired by a news article about a person in France having murdered someone, but the court considered the act as a "crime of passion," and that it therefore couldn't be tried on the same basis of a regular homicidal murder.

Formats
7" UK vinyl single (Arista TWINS 5)
"Sister Of Mercy" - 4:55
"Out Of The Gap" - 5:53

12" UK vinyl single (Arista TWINS 125)
"Sister Of Mercy" (Extended Version) - 9:26
"Out Of The Gap" (Extended Version) - 8:57

5" UK shaped picture disc (Arista TWISD 5) [Shaped like a spaceship]
"Sister Of Mercy" - 4:55
"Out Of The Gap" - 5:48

7" Japanese vinyl single (Nippon Phonogram 7RS-103)
"Sister Of Mercy" (LP Version) - 5:07
"You Take Me Up" - 5:53

12" Japanese vinyl single (Nippon Phonogram 15RS-28) 
"Sister Of Mercy" (Extended Version) - 9:26
"Funeral Dance" - 3:15
"You Take Me Up" (Extended Version) - 7:33
"Leopard Ray" - 3:50

Chart performance

Official versions

Personnel 
Written by  Tom Bailey, Alannah Currie, and Joe Leeway.
Tom Bailey - vocals, synthesizer, bass, guitar, drum programming
Alannah Currie - marimba, xylophone, backing vocals, percussion
Joe Leeway - backing vocals, congas, synthesizer
 Produced by Alex Sadkin with Tom Bailey 
 Recorded and mixed by Phil Thornalley
 "Out Of The Gap" mixed by The Swedish Eagle & Chris Modig in Los Angeles
 Photography - Paul Cox
 Artwork/Design - Satori (Andie Airfix)
 Art Direction - Alannah

References

1984 singles
Thompson Twins songs
Songs written by Alannah Currie
Songs written by Tom Bailey (musician)
Songs written by Joe Leeway
1984 songs
Arista Records singles